Building 429 is the sixth studio self-titled album by Christian rock band, Building 429, which was released on October 21, 2008 through INO Records. This recording is the band's fourth full-length major label recording.

Track listing

Personnel 
Building 429
 Jason Roy – lead and backing vocals, guitars
 Jesse Garcia – keyboards, guitars, backing vocals
 Michael Anderson – drums

Additional musicians
 Christopher Stevens – programming, guitars, backing vocals
 Paul Moak – guitars
 Tony Lucido – bass
 Claire Indie – cello (3, 5)
 Zach Casebolt – violin (3, 5)
 Chris Rodriguez – backing vocals

Production
 Christopher Stevens – producer, recording, mixing
 Paul Moak – additional engineer, editing
 Kevin Powell – additional engineer, editing
 Hank Williams – mastering at MasterMix, Nashville, Tennessee
 James Rueger – A&R
 Dana Salsedo – creative direction
 Matt Taylor – art direction, design
 Zec Petaja – photography

References

Building 429 albums
2008 albums
INO Records albums